Reach for It is a studio album by the American keyboardist and record producer George Duke. It was recorded at Paramount Recording Studios in Los Angeles, California, and released in 1977 through Epic Records. The album peaked at number 25 on the US Billboard 200 and number 4 on the Top R&B/Hip-Hop Albums chart. It was certified Gold by Recording Industry Association of America on January 18, 1978.

Its only single, a self-titled track "Reach for It", peaked at number 54 on the US Billboard Hot 100 and at number 2 on the Hot R&B/Hip-Hop Songs charts.

Track listing

Personnel 
 George Duke – keyboards, vocals 
 Charles "Icarus" Johnson – guitar, vocals (4, 9)
 Michael Sembello – guitar (8)
 Stanley Clarke – bass (8)
 Leon "Ndugu" Chancler – drums, rototoms, timbales, vocals (4, 8)
 Manolo Badrena – congas, bongos, percussion
 Raul De Souza – trombone (6)
 Dee Henrichs – vocals
 Sybil Thomas – vocals
 Deborah Thomas – vocals

Production 
 George Duke – producer
 Kerry McNabb – engineer
 John Golden – mastering at Kendun Recorders (Burbank, California).
 Glen Christensen – art direction
 Norman Seeff – photography
 Herb Cohen – management

Charts

Weekly charts

Year-end charts

Certifications

References

External links 

1977 albums
George Duke albums
Epic Records albums
Albums produced by George Duke